Estádio Juca Ribeiro was a stadium in Uberlândia, Brazil. It had a capacity of 20,000 spectators.  It was the home of Uberlândia Esporte Clube until the Estádio Parque do Sabiá opened in 1982.

References

Defunct football venues in Brazil